Keijo Koivumäki (4 November 1926 – 5 December 2017) was a Finnish rower. He competed in the men's double sculls event at the 1952 Summer Olympics.

References

External links
 

1926 births
2017 deaths
Finnish male rowers
Olympic rowers of Finland
Rowers at the 1952 Summer Olympics
People from Seinäjoki
Sportspeople from South Ostrobothnia